Kevin Walls is a Scottish film director. He graduated from the Glasgow School of Art and is probably best known for the short film Identical in which he won the Best Sound accolade at the 2015 edition of the British Academy Scotland New Talent Awards.

Filmography

Awards and nominations

References

External links

Living people
Scottish film directors
Scottish screenwriters
Scottish film producers
Alumni of the Glasgow School of Art
Year of birth missing (living people)